Eaten Alive (known under various alternate titles, including Death Trap, Horror Hotel, and Starlight Slaughter, and stylized on the poster as Eaten Alive!) is a 1976 American horror film directed by Tobe Hooper, and written by Kim Henkel, Alvin L. Fast, and Mardi Rustam.

The film stars Carolyn Jones, Neville Brand, Roberta Collins, Robert Englund, William Finley, Marilyn Burns, Janus Blythe, and Kyle Richards. Brand plays a psychotic hotel proprietor in rural East Texas, who feeds those who upset him to a large crocodile that lives in a swamp beside the hotel.

Plot
After refusing a demand for anal sex from a pimp customer named Buck, naïve prostitute Clara Wood is evicted from the town brothel by the madame, Miss Hattie. Clara makes her way to the decrepit Starlight Hotel, located deep in the remote swampland of rural Texas, where she encounters the hotel's mentally disturbed proprietor, Judd. Suffering from his demented sexual frustrations, Judd attacks Clara with a pitchfork, then chases her outside, where she is attacked and eaten by his pet Nile crocodile that lives in the swamp beside the hotel.

Some days later, a fractious couple, the well-dressed, pill-popping Faye and her disturbed husband Roy arrive at the hotel, along with their young daughter and apparent polio victim, Angie. Shortly after their arrival, the family dog, Snoopy, is brutally attacked by the resident crocodile, which shocks little Angie. In retaliation, Roy goes out to kill the carnivorous swamp creature but is stabbed and killed by Judd, who is wielding a large scythe. Judd then violently beats and straps Faye onto her bed and attempts to grab Angie, but she can escape and hides under the hotel's porch.

Later, Harvey Wood and his daughter Libby also arrive at the Starlight Hotel, seeking information on the now-deceased Clara, who is Harvey's runaway daughter, but they leave when Judd denies having seen her. Accompanied by Sheriff Martin, Harvey and Libby question Miss Hattie, who also denies ever seeing Clara. Harvey returns to the creepy swamp hotel alone, while Libby goes for dinner and drinks with the sheriff. After Harvey discovers a captive Faye in her hotel room, Judd murders him, once again utilizing his large scythe.

Meanwhile, after being kicked out of a bar by the sheriff, scummy Buck and his underaged girlfriend Lynette venture to the Starlight, much to the annoyance of Judd. When Buck hears screams coming from Faye and Angie crying under the porch, he gets pushed into the swamp by Judd and devoured by the crocodile. Lynette runs outside and is spotted by Judd. She runs into the woods screaming, and he pursues her. However, the fog causes Judd to lose sight of her, and Lynette is saved by a man in a passing car.

Later, Libby arrives back at the hotel and manages to untie Faye from her bed and retrieve Angie from under the porch. Consumed with madness, Judd chases the three survivors into the swamp, where he is finally attacked and killed by his pet reptile. Sheriff Martin arrives and rescues Libby, Faye, and Angie. Before the credits rolled, Judd's arm came up from the water.

Cast
 Neville Brand as Judd
 Mel Ferrer as Harvey Wood
 Carolyn Jones as Miss Hattie
 Marilyn Burns as Faye
 William Finley as Roy
 Stuart Whitman as Sheriff Martin
 Roberta Collins as Clara Wood
 Kyle Richards as Angie
 Robert Englund as Buck
 Crystin Sinclaire as Libby Wood
 Janus Blythe as Lynette

Production

Working under the title Death Trap, Eaten Alive was filmed entirely on the sound stages of Raleigh Studios in Hollywood, California, which had a large-scale pool that could double as a swamp. Shooting on a sound stage instead of a practical location contributed to the atmosphere of the film, which director Tobe Hooper described as a "surrealistic, twilight world." The film eventually proved to be problematic for the director, though, who left the set shortly before production ended, due to a dispute with the producers. Hooper's good relationship with his actors remained intact, though. The director later recalled how he worked with actor Neville Brand to fully develop the character of Judd, declaring, "He understood what he was doing exactly.”

Adapted for the screen by The Texas Chain Saw Massacre co-writer Kim Henkel, the plot was very loosely based on the story of Joe Ball (also known as the Bluebeard from South Texas or the Alligator Man) who owned a bar with a live alligator attraction during the 1930s in Elmendorf, Texas. During this time, Ball murdered several women. Legend has it that he disposed of his victims' bodies by feeding them to his pet alligators, but this was never proven.

Release

Censorship
Although passed with cuts for its theatrical release in Britain in 1978, when Eaten Alive was released on home video by VIPCO under the title Death Trap in 1982, the film became one of the first of the so-called "video nasties" to be prosecuted under the Obscene Publications Act 1959. Its gratuitous violence became the focal point of many social critics in the UK, including a very vocal crusader for the moral minority Mary Whitehouse, and consequently all video copies were removed from retail stores. When the film was finally re-released on VHS in 1992, the BBFC edited out about 25 seconds from the original cut. The film was eventually released in its uncut version on DVD in 2000.

Critical reception

Dennis Schwartz from Ozus' World Movie Reviews gave the film a grade C+, writing, "This is so much the opposite of a Hollywood film, as Hooper could [not] care less that he has shot such a disturbing film that makes for an uncomfortable watch. That Hooper takes us down a different road than the usual trashy, macabre, and grisly horror flick, doesn't make it a special film worth seeking out. Just something that those with a morbid curiosity for the unusual in sleaze might not be able to pass on." TV Guide awarded the film two out of five stars, stating, "Although Eaten Alive is not so unusual or terrifying as Texas Chainsaw, Hooper does a fine job of building up the Southern-gothic atmosphere and continues his brilliant use of sound to enhance the sense of unease and suspense." Keith Phipps from The A.V. Club was critical of the film, stating that it lacked the eerie plausibility and stylishness of Hooper's Chainsaw.

Not all reviews of the film, though,  were negative. Ken Hanke in The Official Splatter Movie Guide reappraised the film as a misunderstood masterpiece that captured "the other-worldly madness of the death of the amateur-night-in-Dixie brand of the American Dream." Bill Gibron of PopMatters rated the film 6/10 stars, noting the film's sloppy script, poor lighting, and lack of narrative sense, but stated that the film was "so undeniably inept, so horrendously hobbled, so gosh-darn god awful that it’s friggin’ great!"

References

External links

 
 
 
 

1976 films
1976 horror films
1970s exploitation films
1970s serial killer films
American natural horror films
American serial killer films
1970s English-language films
Films about crocodilians
Films directed by Tobe Hooper
Films with screenplays by Kim Henkel
Backwoods slasher films
Video nasties
1970s American films
American slasher films
American splatter films
American exploitation films